Chichester High School (CHS) is an 11–18 mixed, secondary school and sixth form with academy status in Chichester, West Sussex, England. It was established in September 2016 following the merger of Chichester High School for Boys and Chichester High School for Girls. It is part of The Kemnal Academies Trust.

History

Chichester High School For Girls 
The Chichester High School For Girls was established in 1910. It merged with the Lancastrian School for Girls in 1972. Lancastrian Schools were founded in Chichester by Joseph Lancaster 1811/1812.

The school held dual specialist Science College and Arts College status before converting to academy status in September 2013, when the number on roll was 1463 including over 400 students in the sixth form, which was already fully integrated with Chichester High School for Boys.

The South Downs Planetarium, which is situated at the back of the site, opened in April 2002.

The site 
The school's campus was originally in the Stockbridge area of Chichester. Buildings were then built in Kingsham Road, next to Chichester High School for Boys and the school was split between the two sites for a few years, until a largescale building project at Kingsham was completed and the school could fully relocate there.

Facilities 
Recently, the school has carried out a considerable building programme including: a purpose-built building for languages, English, science and design technology, a new Learning Resources Centre, a new administrative and reception area with wireless network. The synthetic Astroturf pitch has been refurbished. The sixth form centre has been extended to accommodate an increased number of sixth formers. A new sports hall has recently been completed. The South Downs Planetarium, supported by Sir Patrick Moore, a local resident, was opened on the site on 5 April 2002.

Sports 
The school has extensive sporting facilities, including an international-standard irrigated all-weather hockey pitch, a large sports hall, tennis courts, a gym hall, a dance studio, and extensive grounds for a whole range of competitive sports, such as netball, hockey, rugby, football, tennis, squash, athletics, and badminton. A separate sports centre was completed in 2009, providing students with modern sports facilities.

References

External links 
 

Education in Chichester
Secondary schools in West Sussex
Academies in West Sussex
Educational institutions established in 2016
2016 establishments in England